The following is a list of notable events and releases of the year 1935 in Norwegian music.

Events

Deaths

 September
 7 – Per Winge, conductor, pianist and composer (born 1858).
 24 – Caroline Schytte Jensen, writer and composer (born 1848).

 December
 4 – Johan Halvorsen, composer, conductor and violinist (born 1864).
 9 – Nina Grieg, lyric soprano and singing teacher (born 1845).

 Unknown date
 Emil Biorn, sculptor, painter and composer (born 1864).
 Knut Glomsaas, military musician (born 1863).

Births

 May
 19 – Tore Jensen, jazz trumpeter and bandleader.

 December
 5 – Totti Bergh, jazz saxophonist (died 2012).
 15 – Birgitte Grimstad, singer, guitarist, composer and writer.

See also
 1935 in Norway
 Music of Norway

References

 
Norwegian music
Norwegian
Music
1930s in Norwegian music